Michael Haussman is an American director, writer, and artist, living in Rome, Italy.

Career 
Michael Haussman's music videos have won several awards, including six MTV Video Music Awards and a Museum of Modern Art Award.

Past films include: Rhinoceros Hunting In Budapest, starring Nick Cave, which premiered at the Sundance Film Festival; Blind Horizon, starring Sam Shepard; The Unsinkable Henry Morgan, which also premiered at Sundance Film Festival; and The Audition, which premiered at the Venice International Film Festival.

Michael Haussman's most recent art exhibition, Gravity, premiered at Los Angeles Pacific Design Center. Gravity was presented at Berlin Art Week, courtesy of Iconoclast Galleries. It was featured in 2018 at Cannes, InOut Art Exhibition. As a painter, Haussman's solo art show Naturales, featuring large-scale matador and bull paintings (ink on paper), premiered at the Desoto gallery in Los Angeles and New York Scope Art Fair.

Awards 
Best Short Film, "The Audition", Byron Bay International Film Festival
Best Foreign Film, "The Audition", NYC Downtown Short Film Festival
Best Dance Video, "Do It Again" by The Chemical Brothers at the MTV Video Music Award Japan
Best Electronic Video, "Do It Again" by The Chemical Brothers at the MVPA Awards
Best Music Video, "La Tortura" (Alejandro Sanz and Shakira), MTV Latin America Video Music Awards (see La Tortura#Accolades)
Best Music Video by Female Artist, "Verás" (Madonna), MTV Latino Award
Best Music Video by Female Artist, "Take a Bow" by Madonna, MTV Video Music Awards
Excellence in Music Video "Take a Bow" by Madonna, AICP Awards Museum of Modern Art
Best Short Film, "Abandoned 58", Berlin International Film Festival

Filmography

Films – Director 
 Abandoned '58
 Rhinoceros Hunting in Budapest
 The Last Serious Thing
 Blind Horizon 
 The Unsinkable Henry Morgan  
 The Audition
 Edge of the World

Films – Writer 

 Abandoned '58
 Rhinoceros Hunting in Budapest
 The Last Serious Thing
 The Audition

Films – Producer 

 The Last Serious Thing
 Jack Taylor of Beverly Hills
 The Audition

Television series 

 Do Not Disturb (post-production) – creator, writer, showrunner, director, producer

Art film
 Gravity

Music videos

 "Love... Thy Will Be Done" (Martika) 
 "Night Calls" (Joe Cocker) 
 "Hazard (chapter 2)" (Richard Marx) 
 "Hazard (chapter 1)" (Richard Marx) 
 "Can't Do a Thing (To Stop Me)" (Chris Isaak) 
 "Not the Only One" (Bonnie Raitt) 
 "Take a Bow" (Madonna) 
 "You'll See"/"Verás" (Madonna) 
 "My Love Is for Real" (Paula Abdul) 
 "Riding with the King" (Eric Clapton & B. B. King) 
 "Optimistique-moi" (Mylène Farmer)

 "Jesus Walks" (Kanye West) 
 "Someday (I Will Understand)" (Britney Spears) 
 "La Tortura" (Shakira featuring Alejandro Sanz) 
 "You Know My Name" (Chris Cornell) 
 "SexyBack" (Justin Timberlake featuring Timbaland) 
 "Do It Again" (The Chemical Brothers) 
 "Qué Hiciste" (Jennifer Lopez) 
 "Singin' in the Rain" (Usher) (For CBS' "Movies Rock" TV special)
 "Brave" (Jennifer Lopez) (Unreleased) 
 "Same Old Love" (Selena Gomez) 
 "Your Song" (Rita Ora)

Making the video TV series
Madonna: No Bull! The Making of "Take a Bow" 
Chris Cornell – "You Know My Name"
Jennifer Lopez – "Qué Hiciste"
Justin Timberlake featuring Timbaland – "SexyBack"
Britney Spears – "Someday (I Will Understand)" – Mini Behind The Scenes
Shakira featuring Alejandro Sanz – "La Tortura"

References

External links
 
 

Living people
American filmmakers
1964 births
American music video directors